Villus (plural villi) may refer to:
 Intestinal villus, refers to any one of the small, finger-shaped outgrowths of the epithelial lining of the wall of the intestine. Clusters of projections are referred as intestinal villi.
 Chorionic villi, found on the surface of the outermost membrane (the chorion) of the fetus
 Arachnoid villi, located on the arachnoid membrane of the brain

See also 
 Villi (disambiguation)
 

no:Tarmtott